Raithu Bidda is a 1971 Indian Telugu-language drama film directed by B. A. Subba Rao. It stars N. T. Rama Rao and Vanisri with music composed by S. Hanumantha Rao. It was produced by Kotla Venkata Ramayya under the Lakshmi Kala Films banner.

Plot
Zamindar Jagapathi Rao, after the death of his first wife, marries Lakshmi Devi (Santha Kumari). Ramu (N. T. Rama Rao) is the step-son of Lakshmi Devi whereas Prasad (Jaggayya) is her own. Nevertheless, with the relationship, the brothers are bonded with love and affection. Ramu takes care of their farming and his ambition is to make his brother a doctor to serve the poor people.

In the same village lives Bhushayya (Satyanarayana), a moneylender, who is envious of Jagapathi Rao's family, his only daughter Radha (Anuradha) loves Prasad. Dharmayya (Ch. Krishna Murthy) a middle-class farmer, has two daughters Sarada (Prasanna Rani) and Santha (Vanisri), his elder son-in-law Pullayya (Rajanala) is a straightforward truthful person. Bhushayya exploits him by attributing a crime and gets him arrested. Dharmayya also believes it and does not allow him into the village.

Ramu and Santha fall in love but Bhushayya has a bad eye on her. Meanwhile, Prasad reveals his love affair to his brother and he meets Bhushayya with a marriage proposal when Bhushayya asks to divide the property. Ramu accepts it, but Lakshmi Devi doesn't when Sundaramma (Chaya Devi), the shrewd sister of Lakshmi Devi poisons Prasad's mind, so, he approaches Panchayati. Soon Ramu gives away the entire property and crooked Bhushayya questions what happens if tomorrow Ramu's children claim the property? Then Ramu replies he will never get married and Santha too respects his decision.

Ramu leaves the house, stays along with the farmers, and starts combined farming shutting down Bhushayya's atrocities. Here Bhushayya blames Ramu as a thief and makes the entire village believe it. Insulted, Ramu leaves the village, on the way, he meets Pullayya, and both of them decide to keep a check on Bhushayya's trespass. Meanwhile, Dharmayya has taken a loan from Bhushayya, in return, he asks him to make his marriage with Santha. Parallelly, Bhushayya also cheats Prasad, grabs the property, and brings it to the auction. Ramu, in various forms of disguise, sees the end of Bhushayya and protects Santha and their family's prestige. At last, Prasad requests his brother to take back his word and marry Santha. Finally, the movie ends on the happy note of the marriage of Ramu and Santha.

Cast
N. T. Rama Rao as Ramu
Vanisri as Santha
Jaggayya as Prasad  
Rajanala as Pullayya
Satyanarayana as Bhushayya
Allu Ramalingaiah as Seshayya
Raja Babu as Yellayya
Sridhar as District Collector
Ch. Krishna Murthy as Dharmayya
Santha Kumari as Lakshmi Devi
Chaya Devi as Sundaramma
Anuradha as Radha
Prasanna Rani as Sarada

Music 

Music was composed by S. Hanumantha Rao.

References

1970s Telugu-language films
Films scored by S. Hanumantha Rao